Kamal Keilany (1897–1959) was an Egyptian writer. He was born in Al Qala'a district in Cairo, Egypt.

External links 
Kamel Keilany at Egyptian State Information Service

Egyptian writers
1897 births
1959 deaths
Egyptian children's writers
Writers from Cairo